Rumbling Hole is a cave on Leck Fell, in Lancashire, England. It is part of the Three Counties System, an  cave system that spans the borders of Cumbria, Lancashire, and North Yorkshire.

Description

Four further pitches descend into a chamber to a low canal passage. Upstream gets too low after some 60 metres, but downstream has been forced round some awkward bends and through some ducks into Rumbling Hole Inlet in Lost Johns' Cave.

An alternative route begins from a passage entered a few metres below the west end of the entrance shaft. These passages are, in the main, tighter and more complex than the main route, but the main passage descends an alternative set of pitches to a sump which is believed to be the upstream sump of the inlet canal at the end of the main route.

The main passage starts off as a crawl, but develops into a trench before reaching the shaft.

Geology and hydrology

The cave is a solutional cave formed in Visean Great Scar limestone from the Mississippian Series of the Carboniferous period. Its development has been largely determined by the same vertical fault that may be observed in the nearby Death's Head Hole and Big Meanie. The stream flowing through the cave enters Lost Johns' Cave as a tributary, and eventually emerges from the Leck Beck Head spring in Ease Gill.

History

Rumbling Hole was mentioned in 1842 by Jonathan Otley in his A Descriptive Guide to the English Lakes, and Adjacent Mountains. He thought it an impressive place:
"There lay an abysmal gulf most certainly ; but its head was festooned with long and trailing, or rather pendant locks of ivy. One could have wished to have been so beauteously enwreathed. The verge was adorned with holly, hawthorn, and bilberry, whilst rocks and ledges were carpetted with moss, polypody, blechnum, and oxalis, as well as other plants"
The first descent of the entrance shaft was by Yorkshire Ramblers' Club in 1899, but they reported that the outlet finished in a pool. In 1926 a team from the same club penetrated the outlet fissure for some distance, but were  discouraged by the poor weather. In 1931 a return trip saw the first of the underground pitches descended, and the first complete descent was made in June 1932. The bottom passage was forced through to Lost Johns' Cave by a Lancaster University Speleological Society team in 1985. The Dead Dobbin Series was explored by the Misty Mountain Mud Miners in 2007.

References

Caves of Lancashire
Caves of the Three Counties System